Noël Soetaert (born 23 November 1949) is a former Belgian cyclist. He competed in the tandem event at the 1972 Summer Olympics.

References

External links
 

1949 births
Living people
Belgian male cyclists
Olympic cyclists of Belgium
Cyclists at the 1972 Summer Olympics
Cyclists from West Flanders
People from Middelkerke